The Rev. Richard Harington (5 May 1800 – 13 December 1853) was an Oxford college head in the 19th century.

Barker was born in Hanover Square, Westminster and educated at Brasenose College, Oxford. A mathematician, he was Principal of Brasenose from 1842 until his death.

Notes

 

19th-century English Anglican priests
19th-century English mathematicians
Alumni of Brasenose College, Oxford
Principals of Brasenose College, Oxford
People from Westminster
1800 births
1853 deaths